Azov Governorate (Azovskaya guberniya) was an administrative division (a guberniya) of the Russian Empire, which existed from 1775 to 1783. The administrative seat of the Azov Government was in Belyov Fortress and later in Yekaterinoslav.

Geography and history
Azov Governorate was located in the northeastern Azov littoral region and covered only the southern half of the previously existing Azov Governorate of 1708-25. The new division was created from the southern Bakhmut Province of Voronezh Governorate and the self-governed frontier region of Slavo-Serbia, but primarily it was based on the recently created and quickly liquidated lands of the Don Host. Some of the lands of the Azov Governorate had been acquired by Russia from the Ottoman Empire per the terms of the Treaty of Küçük Kaynarca (signed in 1774) that were lost in 1711 due to the Pruth River Campaign in the Romanian region. In terms of the modern administrative division of Russia, the southern part of Rostov Oblast was part of the second Azov Governorate. In terms of modern Ukraine, most of East Ukraine was part of the Azov Governorate.

To the west it bordered the Novorossiysk Governorate (Kremenchug) created out of the recently liquidated Zaporizhian Sich, to the south - the Azov Sea and the Kuban region (under the suzerainty of Crimean Khanate), to the northwest - the Sloboda Ukraine Governorate (Kharkov), to the north - the Voronezh Governorate, and to the east - the Astrakhan Governorate. The Azov Governorate was also in charge of a number of fortresses around the Crimean peninsula that Russia received from Ottoman Empire and the city of Kerch which controls the Strait of Kerch and access to the Black Sea.

Included territories
In 1775:
 lands: Bakhmut Province (including Slavo-Serbia) and portions of the Don Host Oblast
 fortresses: Saint Demetrius (today part of Rostov-on-Don), Yeni-Kale, Tor (Sloviansk with adjacent lands), and Kinburn (including the Ochakov steppe, former Prohnoyivska palanka)
 cities: Taganrog and Kerch
 New Dnieper Line (fortification line)

1776:
 Yekaterine Province from Novorossiysk Governorate
 the autonomous administration in Slavo-Serbia was discontinued

Beginning around the 1780s, the Azov Governorate was divided into counties (uyezd). The governorate was divided into two provinces, Yekaterine and Bakhmut which in turn were divided into a total of nine uyezds.

In less than ten years the government of Azov once again was liquidated after it was merged along with the Novorossiysk Governorate into the Vice-royalty of Yekaterinoslav in 1783.

List of uyezds
 Novomoskovsky Uyezd (Yekaterinoslavsky)
 Alexandrovsky Uyezd
 Pavlogradsky Uyezd (Pavlovsky)
 Mariupolsky Uyezd
 Konstantinogradsky Uyezd
 Taganrogsky Uyezd
 Bakhmutsky Uyezd
 Slovyansky Uyezd
 Tsarychansky Uyezd

Administration
The Azov Government along with Novorossiysk, Astrakhan, and Saratov governments united under the Potyomkin's Novorossiysk General Government
 1775-1779 Grigory Potemkin

The administration of the governorate was performed by a governor. The governors of the second Azov Governorate were
 1775–1781 Vasily Alexeyevich Chertkov;
 1781-? Georgy Gavrilovich Gersevanov.

Nationality
 By the Imperial census of 1778.

References

External links
 
 

Governorates of the Russian Empire
States and territories established in 1775
1775 establishments in the Russian Empire
1783 disestablishments in the Russian Empire
1770s in Ukraine
1780s in Ukraine
Sea of Azov